Los Titanes is a seaside resort in Canelones Department, Uruguay.

References

External links 

 Instituto Nacional de Estadística: Plano de los balnearios de San Luis, Los Titanes y La Tuna

Populated places in the Canelones Department
Seaside resorts in Uruguay